The 2007 If Stockholm Open was a men's tennis tournament played on indoor hard courts. It was the 39th edition of the event known that year as the If Stockholm Open, and was part of the International Series of the 2007 ATP Tour. It took place at the Kungliga tennishallen in Stockholm, Sweden, from 8 October until 14 October 2007. Seventh-seeded Ivo Karlović won the singles title.

The announced draw featured ATP No. 7, Cincinnati Masters runner-up, Sydney and New Haven winner, and two-time Stockholm defending champion James Blake, US Open semifinalist, Auckland, Båstad and Tokyo titlist David Ferrer, and Sopot and Metz champion Tommy Robredo. Also lined up were Memphis titlist Tommy Haas, Buenos Aires, Pörtschach and Kitzbühel champion Juan Mónaco, Jarkko Nieminen, Ivo Karlović and Fernando Verdasco.

Finals

Singles

 Ivo Karlović defeated  Thomas Johansson, 6–3, 3–6, 6–1
 It was Karlović's 3rd singles title of the year and of his career.

Doubles

 Jonas Björkman /  Max Mirnyi defeated  Arnaud Clément /  Michaël Llodra, 6–4, 6–4

References

External links
 Official website 
 Singles draw
 Doubles draw

 
If Stockholm Open
2007
October 2007 sports events in Europe
2000s in Stockholm
Open